Olenecamptus mordkovitschi is a species of beetle in the family Cerambycidae. It was described by Tsherepanov and Dub. in 2000.

References

Dorcaschematini
Beetles described in 2000